Carbonear-Harbour Grace is a defunct provincial electoral district for the House of Assembly of Newfoundland and Labrador, Canada. In 2011 there were 9,205 eligible voters living within the district.

Being a regional services centre heavily influences the district's economy. Communities include: Carbonear, Harbour Grace, Bristol's Hope, Bryant's Cove, Freshwater, Harbour Grace South, Riverhead, Spaniard's Bay, Tilton Upper Island Cove, and Victoria.

The district was abolished in 2015, and was succeeded by the new districts of Harbour Grace-Port de Grave and Carbonear-Trinity-Bay de Verde.

Members of the House of Assembly

Carbonear-Harbour Grace

Harbour Grace

Election results
}
|-

|-

|align="right"|2,313
|align="right"|42.12
|align="right"|-34.17
 
|NDP
|Charlene Sudbrink
|align="right"|410
|align="right"|7.47
|align="right"|-1.03

|}

|-

|-

|-
 
|NDP
|Shawn Hyde
|align="right"|445
|align="right"|8.50
|align="right"|
|-
 
|Independent
|Kyle Brookings
|align="right"|22
|align="right"|0.42
|align="right"|

|}

|-

|-

|}

|-

|-

|}

|-

|-

|-

|NDP
|Kevin Noel
|align="right"|391
|align="right"|5.73
|align="right"|+1.46
|}

|-

|-

|-

|NDP
|Linda Soper
|align="right"|292
|align="right"|4.27
|align="right"|
|}

References

External links
Website of the Newfoundland and Labrador House of Assembly

Newfoundland and Labrador provincial electoral districts